The Brecherspitz is a mountain in Bavaria, Germany. It is about 18 minutes from nearby towns of Fischbachau and Schliersee. From the top, you can see views of small lake Spitzingsee, Miesbach District, and Austrian Border.

References 

Mountains of Bavaria
One-thousanders of Germany
Mountains of the Alps